The International Journal of African Historical Studies publishes peer reviewed articles on all aspects of African history. The journal was established in 1968 as African Historical Studies.

External links 
 Access to African Historical Studies (1968–1971) on JSTOR

African history journals
Publications established in 1968
English-language journals
Boston University